The quantum cylindrical quadrupole is a solution to the Schrödinger equation,

One peculiar potential that can be solved exactly is when the electric quadrupole moment is the dominant term of an infinitely long cylinder of charge. It can be shown that the Schrödinger equation is solvable for a cylindrically symmetric electric quadrupole, thus indicating that the quadrupole term of an infinitely long cylinder can be quantized. In the physics of classical electrodynamics, it can be shown that the scalar potential and associated mechanical potential energy of a cylindrically symmetric quadrupole is as follows:

 (SI units)
 (SI units)

Using cylindrical symmetry, the time independent Schrödinger equation becomes the following:

Using separation of variables, the above equation can be written as two ordinary differential equations in both the radial and azimuthal directions. The radial equation is Bessel's equation as can be seen below.

Azimuthal equation
The azimuthal equation is given by

This is the Mathieu equation,

The solution of the Mathieu equation is expressed in terms of the Mathieu cosine  and the Mathieu sine  for unique a and q.

In general, Mathieu functions are not periodic. The term q must be that of a characteristic value in order for Mathieu functions to be periodic. It can be shown that the solution of the radial equation highly depends on what characteristic values are seen in this case.

See also 
 Cylindrical multipole moments

References

External links
 MULTIPOLE EXPANSION
 The nonvanishing coefficients of the dipole moment expansion in axially symmetric molecules

Quantum mechanics